Kebezen is a rural locality (a selo) in Kebezenskoye Rural Settlement of Turochaksky District, the Altai Republic, Russia. The population was 615 as of 2016. There are 19 streets.

Geography 
Kebezen is located near the Biya River, 48 km south of Turochak (the district's administrative centre) by road. Stary Kebezen is the nearest rural locality.

References 

Rural localities in Turochaksky District